The Jeckenbach Formation is a geologic formation in Germany. It preserves fossils dating back to the Permian period.

See also

 List of fossiliferous stratigraphic units in Germany

References
 

Permian Germany